Talkbox Messenger (formerly named TalkBox and Talkbox Voice Messenger) is a smartphone application that enables users of iPhone, Android, Windows Phone and BlackBerry to easily communicate via push-to-talk instant voice messages as well as sharing geo-location, pictures and group chat with one another. Users’ voice is carefully curated and delivered by Talkbox voice bubbles of maximum 1 minute. Talkbox also integrated with different social networking elements which enables users to post voice post using Agent Twitter or Agent Facebook. It can also be applied to different business scenario from talking to an oversea business acquaintance without having to schedule an appointment to brainstorming a new product ideas with the team using group chat.

Talkbox acquired one million users within one month of initial release.

On Feb 1,2019, the app was renamed as Talkbox Messenger, with release of version 3.0.

References

External links 
 TalkBox Official website

Android (operating system) software
IOS software
Instant messaging clients
Cross-platform software